Michel Marie Claparède (28 August 1770, in Gignac – 23 October 1842, in Montpellier) was a French general. His name is engraved on the Arc de Triomphe.

Life 
Claparède enlisted in a battalion of volunteers in 1792. Having been promoted to captain he served under Napoleon Bonaparte in Italy. Having given command of a battalion in the Army of the Rhine, Claparède served at Hohenlinden. He took part in Charles Leclerc’s failed expedition to Santo Domingo. Having been promoted to general de brigade he returned to France in 1804, where he joined the Grande Armée at Boulogne.

When the War of the Third Coalition started, Claparède commanded a brigade in Suchet’s division from the V Corps of Marshal Lannes. With this unit he distinguished himself at Ulm, Austerlitz, Saalfeld, Jena, Pultusk and Ostrołęka.
Having been promoted to general de division in October 1808, in the War of the Fifth Coalition, Claparède distinguished himself at the twin battles of Aspern-Essling and at Wagram. During the following years he served in Portugal and Spain but in 1812 he was recalled to the Grande Armée for the French invasion of Russia. In Russia he served at Smolensk, Borodino and the crossing of the Berezina. Having served in the 1813 German campaign and the 1814 French campaigns, he distinguished himself at Leipzig and Paris.

During the Bourbon Restoration Claparède served as inspector-general of the 1st military division and as Pair de France.

Wounds 
He was wounded at the Battles of Pułtusk and Berezina.

Decorations

Titles 

 Comte de l'Empire by imperial decree of 19 March 1808 and letters patent of 29 June 1808
 Confirmed as a hereditary count by royal ordinance of 23 June 1816

Honours and mentions

Other roles

Pensions, rents

Coat of arms

External links
  Archives nationales (CARAN) – Service Historique de l’Armée de Terre – Fort de Vincennes – Dossier S.H.A.T. Côte : 7 Yd 477 ; Dossier de la Légion d'honneur côte  LH/541/39.
  Côte S.H.A.T., état de services, distinctions sur web.genealogie.free.fr : Les militaires
  Biography on lesapn.forumactif.fr : Les Amis du Patrimoine Napoléonien.

Bibliography 

  ;
  ;
 .

Notes 

1770 births
1842 deaths
French generals
Members of the Chamber of Peers of the Bourbon Restoration
French commanders of the Napoleonic Wars
French military personnel of the French Revolutionary Wars
Military personnel from Montpellier
Names inscribed under the Arc de Triomphe